Shisharestan (also Romanized as Shīshārestān; also known as Shesh Ārestān) is a village in Amlash-e Jonubi Rural District, in the Central District of Amlash County, Gilan Province, Iran. At the 2006 census, its population was 619, in 174 families.

References 

Populated places in Amlash County